The 1987–88 Chicago Blackhawks season was the 62nd season of operation of the Chicago Blackhawks in the National Hockey League.

Offseason
The 1987–88 Chicago Black Hawks were coming off a year in which they finished third in the Norris Division and were swept in the first round of the playoffs by the Detroit Red Wings. The Blackhawks made several moves in the offseason with GM Bob Pulford replacing himself as coach with Bob Murdoch and trading young star Eddie Olczyk and aging star Al Secord to the Toronto Maple Leafs for wingers Rick Vaive and Steve Thomas and defenseman Bob McGill. Goaltender Bob Mason was the summer's big free agent signing. Though relatively untested at the NHL level, Mason was in demand after an impressive performance in the 1987 playoffs. In addition to Mason, the team signed Ed Belfour who had just backstopped the University of North Dakota to the NCAA championship, and used their number one pick in the June draft to select Jimmy Waite from the Quebec Major Junior Hockey League. The Blackhawks regular goaltenders from the previous season, veterans Murray Bannerman and Bob Sauve, never played another regular season game for Chicago. The Blackhawks also acquired Duane Sutter from the New York Islanders in exchange for a 2nd round pick in the 1988 NHL Entry Draft. Captain Darryl Sutter retired before the start of the season and the team chose not to name a replacement.

Regular season
The Blackhawks were a streaky team – winning five in row in October, followed by 7 straight without a win, then won five of the next seven, then lost eight straight. The up and down season ended on the down with the Hawks going winless in their last eight games of the season. The team's fortunes were greatly hampered by injuries, with regulars Doug Wilson, Keith Brown, Steve Thomas, Wayne Presley, Duane Sutter, Bob Murray, and Behn Wilson, all missing considerable playing time. They would finish the season 30–41–9 (69 Points) – good for 3rd Place in the Norris Division.

Offensively, the Blackhawks were again led by Denis Savard, who had an outstanding season leading the team in scoring for the seventh year in a row with team highs of 44 goals, 87 assists and 131 points (which ranked third in the league behind Lemieux and Gretzky). Steve Larmer was again second in points with 41 goals and 48 assists. Offseason acquisition Rick Vaive was second in goals with 43, and mid-season addition, Dirk Graham had 37 points in his half-season with the Hawks. On defense, Doug Wilson again led the club with 32 points (in just 27 games), with Keith Brown leading in the club in plus/minus with +5. Gary Nylund led the team in penalty minutes with 208.

In goal, rookie Darren Pang took over in the net with a 3.48 GAA and a 17-23-1 record in 45 games. Bob Mason was relegated to the bench more and more as the season wore on and finished with a 4.15 GAA and 13–18–8 record in 41 games.

Final standings

Schedule and results

Playoffs
The Hawks faced Brett Hull and the St. Louis Blues, who finished second in the Norris. After the Blackhawks had been swept two years in a row in the first round, they opened the series in St Louis and lost both games 4–1 and 3–2. The series moved to the Chicago Stadium where the Hawks broke their 11 game playoff losing streak with a 6–3 victory. The winning ways did not last though, as the Hawks lost the next two games – 6–5 and 5–3.

Player stats

Regular season
Scoring

Goaltending

Playoffs
Scoring

Goaltending

Note: Pos = Position; GP = Games played; G = Goals; A = Assists; Pts = Points; +/- = plus/minus; PIM = Penalty minutes; PPG = Power-play goals; SHG = Short-handed goals; GWG = Game-winning goals
      MIN = Minutes played; W = Wins; L = Losses; T = Ties; GA = Goals-against; GAA = Goals-against average; SO = Shutouts; SA = Shots against; SV = Shots saved; SV% = Save percentage;

Awards and records

Transactions

Draft picks
Chicago's draft picks at the 1987 NHL Entry Draft held at the Joe Louis Arena in Detroit, Michigan. The Blackhawks attempted to select Derek Pizzey in the second round of the 1987 NHL Supplemental Draft, but the claim was ruled invalid since Pizzey hadn’t turned age 21 yet and therefore did not meet eligibility requirements.

Farm teams

See also
1987–88 NHL season

References

2. 1988-89 Chicago Blackhawks Yearbook (official team publication)

External links
 

Chic
Chic
Chicago Blackhawks seasons
Chicago
Chicago